The Darmstadt American rock-throwing incident was a 2000 incident in which three children of American soldiers stationed at a U.S. military base near Darmstadt, Germany threw rocks at vehicles moving on the B3 motorway, killing two women in separate car accidents. The children, aged 14, 17 and 18 at the time of the attacks, were convicted of first-degree murder in a German court and given sentences ranging from 7 to 8-and-a-half years in prison. After serving half of their sentences, the three were released early on good behavior and returned to the United States.

Incident
On the night of February 27, 2000, the three youths, ages 14, 17 and 18, confessed to throwing rocks at vehicles moving along the B3 motorway, saying that they had been "meeting regularly" for the past four to six weeks to throw rocks at cars.  A fourth teenager (age 15) was questioned and released.

The teenagers left a bowling alley near their homes in a base housing complex called Lincoln Village at about 9pm. They carried a snow shovel and some rocks to a pedestrian bridge over the B3 motorway, where they climbed a   plastic wall and began throwing rocks at passing cars.

They threw a  rock at a Mercedes-Benz driven by Karin Rothermel, 41, hitting her in the chest and killing her instantly.  Sitting in the passenger seat, Rothermel's 75-year-old grandmother was critically injured, her 75-year-old grandfather in the backseat was slightly injured. At this point they moved to the other side of the bridge, and began hurling rocks at cars moving in the opposite direction, causing one car to crash as it swerved to avoid the rocks.  The three then dropped an  stone onto a BMW driven by Sandra Ottmann, 20, who was driving her grandparents home from a meal celebrating her grandfather's birthday. The rock hit Ottman in the head, killing her.

The rock-throwers, aged 18, 17 and 14, were convicted of double murder and attempted murders in three cases and given terms of 8-and-a-half years, 8 years and 7 years in juvenile facilities; the 14-year-old was given seven years. As the 4th panel chamber of Germany's Federal Court of Justice discarded their appeal, the judgement became final on July 10, 2001.

The three were released early for good behavior and supposed to return to the United States after serving half of their sentences. While Wise was released in September 2003 and Griff in May 2004, Bissessar remained past the halfway point of his sentence to finish work on a painting course, so that he was released on the same day as Griff. The three returned to the United States.

Later incidents
A similar rock throwing occurred near the same base in 2003; no one was injured. The children involved ranged in age from 4 to 9 years old.

Reactions
Secretary of Defense William Cohen said, in a statement issued by the American Embassy in Berlin, that he was "shocked and saddened" by the "tragic accident" and pledged to cooperate closely with German authorities in the investigation.  He said that American thoughts and prayers were with the victims' families.

References

Deaths by rocks thrown at cars
United States military in Germany
2000 in Germany
2000s in Hesse
February 2000 crimes
Criminal rock-throwing
Murder committed by minors